Ready an' Willing is the third studio album by English hard rock band Whitesnake, released in May 1980. It was the group's first album to feature singer David Coverdale and keyboard player Jon Lord's former Deep Purple colleague Ian Paice on drums. It peaked at No. 6 on the UK Albums Chart, it was also the band's first to chart outside of the UK, reaching No. 32 in Norway and No. 90 in the US.

Release
The album featured two of the band's UK single-hits from that year: "Fool for Your Loving" had reached No. 13 in the charts on 26 April 1980, and the title-track, "Ready an' Willing (Sweet Satisfaction)" made No. 43 in July of the same year. On 2 August 1980 "Fool for Your Loving" peaked at No. 53 on the Billboard Hot 100; the song would later be re-recorded for the Slip of the Tongue album. The track "Blindman", initially from David Coverdale's first solo album White Snake, was re-recorded for this album.

Track listing

Personnel

Whitesnake
David Coverdale – lead and backing vocals
Micky Moody – guitars, backing vocals
Bernie Marsden – guitars, backing vocals
Neil Murray – bass
Ian Paice – drums
Jon Lord – keyboards

Production
Martin Birch – producer, engineer, mixing

Charts

Album

Singles
Fool for Your Loving

 Ready an' Willing

Certifications

Accolades

References

Whitesnake albums
1980 albums
United Artists Records albums
Albums produced by Martin Birch
Polydor Records albums
Hard rock albums by English artists
Blues rock albums by English artists
Mirage Records albums
Atlantic Records albums